Saint-Barnabé, also known as Saint-Barnabé-Nord, is a parish municipality in the Mauricie region of the province of Quebec in Canada.

Demographics 

Government 
The mayor is the municipality's highest elected official. Saint-Barnabé has had fifty mayors.

Officially, municipal elections in Saint-Barnabé are on a non-partisan basis.

References 

Parish municipalities in Quebec
Incorporated places in Mauricie